Talking animals are a common element in mythology and folk tales, children's literature, and modern comic books and animated cartoons. Fictional talking animals often are anthropomorphic, possessing human-like qualities (such as bipedal walking, wearing clothes, and living in houses). Whether they are realistic animals or fantastical ones, talking animals serve a wide range of uses in literature, from teaching morality to providing social commentary. Realistic talking animals are often found in fables, religious texts, indigenous texts, wilderness coming of age stories, naturalist fiction, animal autobiography, animal satire, and in works featuring pets and domesticated animals. Conversely, fantastical and more anthropomorphic animals are often found in the fairy tale, science fiction, toy story, and fantasy genres.

Utility of talking animals in fiction 
The use of talking animals enables storytellers to combine the basic characteristics of the animal with human behavior, to apply metaphor, and to entertain children as well as adults. Animals are used in a variety of ways in fictional works including to illustrate morality lessons for children, to instill wonder in young readers, and as a tool for inserting social commentary. In addition talking animals can be utilized for satirical purposes, for humorous purposes like in the case of Frog and Toad, and to decentralize and deemphasize the human experience. Talking animals can also be used to create analogies or allegories. For example, in Narnia Aslan the Lion can be seen as an allegory for Christ. Finally, fictional works with talking animals challenge the human-animal divide and they identify children as the members of society who take on the responsibility of being ecological/environmental changemakers.

Realistic/non-fictional animals

In textual representations the creature retains its original form, other than being able to speak. Sometimes it may only speak as a narrator for the reader's convenience. The rabbits in Watership Down who, except for the ability to discuss their actions, behave exactly as normal rabbits, also come under this category, as do characters from animated films like Happy Feet and The Lion King.

Fables 
The tradition of using talking animals in stories dates as far back as 550 BCE with the Greek Aesop’s Fables. The Panchatantra, a collection of Indian animal fables, is another early example. Both use talking animals for didactic purposes. More recent fables like Sarah Trimmer’s History of the Robins (1786) use talking animals to instruct children on how to behave in society as well as how to maintain the social order. They also reiterate the superiority of humans to animals which is why humans are responsible for caring for animals.

Animals in religious texts 
The talking creature concept is featured within much traditional literature, and several mythologies, including Greek, Chinese and Indian mythologies. A notable example from the Judaeo-Christian tradition is the talking serpent from the Book of Genesis, which tempts Eve to eat the forbidden fruit of the Tree of the knowledge of good and evil.

In the Qur’ān, animals are seen as gifts from God and thus are meant to serve humans. Aside from a few animals being able to speak, they are never anthropomorphized, personified, or given names. There are only a handful of times that animals speak in the Qur’ān and most of these occurrences happen in relation to Solomon. For example, it is a hoopoe (a bird native to Africa, Asia, and Europe) that tells King Solomon of Queen Sheba’s idolatrous ways.

Native American/indigenous texts 
In Native American mythology, animals are integral to human survival and thus a part of the Native American family/community. Distinctions between humans and animals are more fluid. In these stories animals represent the ability to adapt and serve as mentors and guides. For example, in Louise Erdrich’s book Chickadee the protagonist is saved by a Chickadee, who instructs him in finding food and water, after he escapes a kidnapping.

Other examples of Native American works with talking animal stories include How I Became a Ghost, Keepers of the Earth, and The Orphan and the Polar Bear, just to name a few.

Wilderness coming-of-age stories 
In the Disney franchises of The Jungle Book and Tarzan, Mowgli along with Shanti and Ranjan can talk to the animals (such as a sloth bear, an elephant, a black panther, a tiger and a python) in the jungles of India, and Tarzan along with Jane and her father can talk to the animals: gorillas and elephants in African jungle. Out of the animals, Sabor the leopard does not speak.

In the French feral child comic book Pyrénée, Pyrénée can talk to the forest animals in the French mountains of Pyrenees. 

In Go, Diego, Go! and Dora the Explorer, Dora and her cousin Diego can talk to the animals in the rainforest.

Naturalist animal fiction 
Animal fictions with more conservation-oriented themes allow young readers to engage with challenging messages at a safe distance. For example, Charlotte’s Web introduces the concept of death when Charlotte dies and Wilbur is charged with taking care of her offspring. Similarly, naturalist animal fictions also provide a vehicle with which to provide commentary on the humane treatment of animals, animal rights, and the conservation of animals. A good example of this would be the Doctor Doolittle series. Finally, in this digital age where modern childhood generally has very little contact and exposure to animals in the natural environment, naturalist animal fictions allow authors to portray natural animal behavior. For instance Bambi, both the 1928 novel and the Disney film, realistically portrays the life cycle of deers. The hunting dogs in the film adaptation, do not talk.

Animal autobiography 
Fictional works told from an animal’s perspective, like the horse in Black Beauty, encourage readers to empathize with animals. Furthermore, more generally they challenge the human-animal divide. Other examples of animal autobiographies include The Life and Perambulations of a Mouse (1783), The Biography of a Spaniel (1806), The Adventures of a Donkey (1815), The Curious Adventures of a Field Cricket (1881), and Thy Servant, a Dog (1930).

Animal satire 
For some authors talking animals, rather than human characters, allowed them to publish their satirical commentary by protecting them from censure. Chaucer’s Canterbury Tales and Orwell’s Animal Farm are some of the most famous examples of this.

Domesticated animals/animals as pets 
Stories like Paddington and Stuart Little involve talking animals that become adopted members of human families. These intimate human relationships help to unsettle the human-animal binary.

Fantastical creatures 

Most people in the industries of professional illustration, cartooning, and animation refer to these types of creature characters as talking animals or anthropomorphic characters.

Fairy tales 
Many fairy tales include talking creatures that prove to be shapeshifted people, or even ghosts. The fairy tales How Ian Direach got the Blue Falcon and Tsarevitch Ivan, the Fire Bird and the Gray Wolf have the hero aided by a fox and a wolf respectively, but in the similar tale The Golden Bird, the talking fox is freed from a spell to become the heroine's brother, and in The Bird 'Grip', the fox leaves the hero after explaining that it was the dead man whose debts the hero had paid.

Whether shape-shifted or merely having the magical ability to speak, the talking creature is perhaps the most common trait of fairy tales. The motif is certainly present in many more tales than fairies.

Science fiction 
A good example of the science fiction genre is the webcomic Anima: Age of the Robots which uses anthropomorphism to portray an alternate world as modern as ours, but inhabited by creature-lookalikes. The intelligent robots that they have made do rebel and threaten the creatures. This serves as a warning to mankind's thoughtless pursuit of technological advancement.

Toy stories 
Animated toys in fictional works are popular for expressing human developmental and existential concerns. In toy literature, there are a few common motifs talking toys are used to convey. For example, talking toys can embody human anxiety about what it means to be “real” as well as reflect struggles of power when they are at the disposal of humans. Another common motif is the religious allusion to divine creation when humans create toys that come alive. Some examples of talking toy animals include the animals in Winnie the Pooh, the wooden toy dog in Poor Cecco, the Skin Horse and Velveteen rabbit in The Velveteen Rabbit, and the Slinky Dog toy and Tyrannosaurus Rex toy in Disney’s Toy Story.

Fantasy 
Anthropomorphism of animals is common in the fantasy genre. For example, in L. Frank Baum's Land of Oz, creatures (such as the Cowardly Lion and the Hungry Tiger) talk. The chicken Billina gains the ability to talk when she is swept away by a storm to land near Oz, as do other animals, and Toto, as explained in a retcon, always had the ability since arriving in Oz, but never used it. In C. S. Lewis's Chronicles of Narnia, the world of Narnia is ruled by a talking lion by the name of Aslan, and many minor characters are talking woodland animals, both of which interact with both the humans of Narnia, and the children who act as the protagonists of the books. In the Sailor Moon franchise, the protagonist Usagi Tsukino and her friends awaken their powers as Sailor Guardians thanks to talking cats Luna and Artemis, who also serve as mentoring figures and advisors to them.

See also 
 Anthropomorphism
 Furry fandom
 Talking animals in science fiction
 Uplift (science fiction)

References

Further reading 
 Blount, M. Animal Land: The Creatures of Children's Fiction. William Morrow & Company, 1975. 336 p.
 Cosslett, T. Talking animals in British children's fiction, 1786-1914. Ashgate Publishing, Ltd., 2006. 205 p. , 
 Elick, C. Talking Animals in Children's Fiction: A Critical Study. McFarland, 2015. 258 p. , 
 
 Morgenstern, J. "Children and other talking animals". The Lion and the Unicorn. 2000. 24.1. pp. 110–127.
 Speaking for animals: Animal Autobiographical Writing. Ed. by Margo DeMello. New York: Routledge, 2012. — 274 p. , 
 Talking Animals Or Humans in Fur?: A Study of Anthropomorphic Animals in Illustrated Children's Literature. Victoria University of Wellington, 1998. 86 p.
 Teupe, L. The Function of Animals in Fairy Tales and Fables. GRIN Verlag, 2014. 12 p. , .
 Ziolkowski, J. M. Talking animals: Medieval Latin beast poetry, 750-115. University of Pennsylvania Press, 1993.

External links 
 

 
Fantasy creatures
Talking
Folklore